Lasiopetalum indutum is a species of flowering plant in the family Malvaceae and is endemic to the south-west of Western Australia. It is an erect or straggling shrub with hairy stems and pink, cream-coloured or white flowers.

Description
Flowering occurs from May to December.

Taxonomy
Lasiopetalum indutum was first formally described in 1845 by Ernst Gottlieb von Steudel in Johann Georg Christian Lehmann's Plantae Preissianae. The specific epithet (indutum) means "covered with a layer of hairs".

Distribution and habitat
This lasiopetalum grows on sandplains, flats and hillslopes in the Esperance Plains, Jarrah Forest and Mallee biogeographic regions of south-western Western Australia.

Conservation status
Lasiopetalum indutum is listed as "not threatened" by the Government of Western Australia Department of Biodiversity, Conservation and Attractions.

References

indutum
Malvales of Australia
Rosids of Western Australia
Plants described in 1845
Taxa named by Ernst Gottlieb von Steudel